The Kiwiburger is a hamburger sold at McDonald's restaurants in New Zealand. It consists of a four-ounce (113 g) beef patty, griddle egg, beetroot, tomato, lettuce, cheese, onions, mustard, and ketchup on a toasted bun.

History
The Kiwiburger was the idea of franchisee Bryan Old, who came up with the burger as a nostalgic take on the typical New Zealand hamburger prior to the introduction of McDonald's to the New Zealand market in 1976. Trialled initially in Old's five Hamilton restaurants, it was added to the national menu in 1991.

The KiwiBurger was reintroduced to McDonald's New Zealand menu in May 2007.

The burger was reintroduced on 17 August 2011 as part of McDonald's promotional Kiwi Menu, introduced ahead of the Rugby World Cup.

References

External links
 1995 Kiwi Burger commercial (video) – Ngā Taonga Sound & Vision
 The Kiwi Burger that contains no kiwi – New Zealand Story

McDonald's foods
New Zealand cuisine
Fast food hamburgers